is a unisex Japanese given name.

Possible writings
The meaning varies depending on the kanji used to write it.  Several written forms include:
  — Springtime
  — Sun, sunlight
  — Clear, sunny

People 
, Japanese Nippon Professional Baseball outfielder
, Japanese concubine of Sun Yat-sen
, Japanese singer, songwriter, and "poetry rapper"
,  Japanese female professional golfer
, Japanese politician
Haru (actress) (born 1991, 波瑠), Japanese actress
Haru Kobayashi (1900–2005, ハル), Japanese musician
Haru Kuroki (born 1990, 華), Japanese actress
, Japanese businessman and politician
Haru M. Reischauer (1915–1998, ハル), Japanese writer
Haru Sasaki
Haru (Chikurin-in), Sanada Yukimura's wife

Fictional characters 
Haru Shinkai, a character from Digimon Universe: Appli Monsters
Haru Okumura, a major character from Persona 5
Haru, a Mii character from Nintendo Wii
Haru, a main character from “My Roommate is a Cat”
Haru, a main character from "Beastars”
Haru, a character from “Avatar: The Last Airbender”
Haru Yoshida, a main character from "My Little Monster"
Haru Katou main character from The Millionaire Detective : Balance Unlimited
Haru Glory, the main character from Rave Master
Haru, a main character from Extraordinary You
Haru Miura, a major character from Reborn!
Haruka Nanase, a main character from Free!
Haruchiyo Sanzu, a character from Tokyo Revengers
Hatsuharu Soma, a character from Fruits Basket

See also 
 Haru (disambiguation)

Japanese unisex given names